The 1975 AIAW women's basketball tournament was held on March 19–22, 1975.  The host site was Madison College in Harrisonburg, Virginia.  Sixteen teams participated, and Delta State University, coached by Hall-of-Famer Margaret Wade, was crowned national champion at the conclusion of the tournament.

Delta State finished the season undefeated (28–0), becoming the second undefeated national champion.

Tournament bracket

Main bracket

Consolation bracket

References

AIAW women's basketball tournament
AIAW
AIAW National Division I Basketball Championship
1975 in sports in Virginia
Women's sports in Virginia